Jennifer is an Indian actress who has appeared in the Tamil film industry. The actress won critical acclaim for her performance in Eera Nilam (2003) and later appeared in other Tamil and Telugu language films.

Career
The daughter of film choreographer Chinna, Jennifer first appeared in a song in Vasanth's Yai Nee Romba Azhaga Irukey  (2002), before starring in S. A. Chandrasekhar's slasher film Mutham (2002) in an ensemble cast, under her original name of Jennifer. She featured in the film alongside actors Nagendra Prasad and Arun Vijay, but it received negative reviews and performed poorly at the box office.  she then appeared in several films throughout 2003, notably starring in Bharathiraja's Eera Nilam, though critics criticized her performance as "comical". She then also appeared in two straight-to-video films alongside Pandiarajan, while another film titled Kaadhal Jaathi directed by Kasthuri Raja remained unreleased after running into financial trouble. Jennifer made several appearances in item numbers in the middle of the 2000s, as she found it difficult to be selected for lead roles.

Jennifer married Kasi Viswanathan, an assistant cinematographer to U. K. Senthil Kumar, at sri kalyana Srinivasa Temple near maganyam village on February 2007 and thereafter stopped appearing in films. In 2013, she made a comeback under her original name in the film Ravana Desam starring newcomers, which told the tale of missing refugees during the 2009 Sri Lankan Civil War.

Filmography
Films

Television

References

External links
 

Living people
Actresses in Tamil cinema
Indian film actresses
21st-century Indian actresses
Actresses in Telugu cinema
Actresses in Kannada cinema
Year of birth missing (living people)